Juan Alberto Merlos (25 May 1945 – 19 June 2021) was an Argentine cyclist. He competed at the 1964 Summer Olympics and the 1968 Summer Olympics.

References

External links
 

1945 births
2021 deaths
Argentine male cyclists
Cyclists at the 1964 Summer Olympics
Cyclists at the 1967 Pan American Games
Cyclists at the 1968 Summer Olympics
Cyclists from Buenos Aires
Medalists at the 1967 Pan American Games
Olympic cyclists of Argentina
Pan American Games medalists in cycling
Pan American Games silver medalists for Argentina